The Gambia competed in the 2003 All-Africa Games held at the National Stadium in the city of Abuja, Nigeria. The team consisted of a single competitor, Gibril Jatta, who went on to win a silver medal in the taekwondo tournament.

Competitors
The Gambia entered a single event.

Medal table

Medal summary
The Gambia won a single silver medal, and was ranked joint twenty ninth in the final medal table alongside Gabon.

List of Medalists

Silver Medal

References

2003 in Gambian sport
Nations at the 2003 All-Africa Games
2003